Melčice-Lieskové  is a village and municipality in Trenčín District in the Trenčín Region of north-western Slovakia.

History
In historical records the village was first mentioned in 1398.

Geography
The municipality lies at an altitude of 202 metres and covers an area of 21.575 km². It has a population of about 1557 people.

External links
 
 
https://web.archive.org/web/20080208225314/http://www.statistics.sk/mosmis/eng/run.html

Villages and municipalities in Trenčín District